Cosmo may refer to:

Business and media 
 Cosmopolitan (magazine), a magazine for women, sometimes referred to as "Cosmo"
 Cosmo's Cosmic Adventure, a 1992 video game
 Cosmo On-Line, a Brazilian generic Internet portal
 Cosmo Radio, a channel on Sirius Satellite Radio
 COSMO (German radio station), a public radio station
 Cosmo TV, alternate name of the cable and satellite television network Cosmopolitan Television
 Cosmo Oil Company (established 1986), Japanese petrochemical company
 Cosmo (restaurant), a chain of buffet restaurants in the United Kingdom
 Mazda Cosmo, any of several cars of this name
 Xda Cosmo, commercial name of the HTC Excalibur smartphone model

Music 
 Cosmo, a band formed by Fran Cosmo and his son Anton Cosmo in 2006
 Doug Clifford (b. 1945), American rock drummer and member of the rock band Creedence Clearwater Revival, nicknamed "Cosmo"
 Cosmo Jarvis, stage name of English singer-songwriter and filmmaker Harrison Cosmo Krikoryan Jarvis
 Cosmo (album), by Creedence drummer Doug Clifford
 Cosmo (song), 2014 single by Comoros / French rapper Soprano
 Cosmo, 2019 single by South Korean band Pentagon
 Cosmo Sheldrake, British musician

People 
 Cosmo (name), a list of people and fictional characters with either the given name or surname.
 Cosmo Gordon Lang (b. 1864), Archbishop of Canterbury (1928–1942).
 Colleen 'Cosmo' Murphy (b. 1968), club disc jockey and music entrepreneur.

Places 
 Cosmo Township, Kearney County, Nebraska
 Cosmo Park, a recreation area in Columbia, Missouri
 Cosmopolis, Washington

Other uses 
 Cosmos (plant), wildflower of the family Asteraceae
 Cosmo (parrot), a parrot known for its cognitive abilities
 Cosmo (dog), dog which starred in Hotel for Dogs
 Cosmopolitan (cocktail), informally called a cosmo
 COSMO Solvation Model, calculation method for determining the electrostatic interaction of a molecule with a solvent
 Cosmo the Cougar, mascot of Brigham Young University
 WTC Cosmo Tower, a skyscraper in Osaka, Kansai, Japan

See also 
 Cosimo (disambiguation)
 Cosmas (disambiguation), includes Kosmas
 Cosmopolitan (disambiguation)
 Cosmos (disambiguation)